Soul, Mind, Body Medicine: A Complete Soul Healing System for Optimum Health and Vitality is a self-help book written by spiritual healer Zhi Gang Sha which provides a controversial interpretation of Traditional Chinese medicine and quantum physics. Published in 2006, within three weeks of its release the book was placed in the top five of The New York Times Best Seller list.

See also
Self-healing

References

2006 non-fiction books
Self-help books